William Roy McCutcheon (July 31, 1929 – July 30, 2019) was a Canadian educator and the second president of Seneca College serving from 1984 through 1992.

President McCutcheon announced his retirement in 1991. Following the announcement, senior Vice-President Steve Quinlan was appointed Seneca's third President effective February 1, 1992.

McCutcheon died on July 30, 2019, on the eve of his 90th birthday.

References

Presidents of Seneca College
1929 births
2019 deaths